Baikuntha Express (Nepali:वैकुण्ठ एक्सप्रेस) is a play written by Mohan Raj Sharma . It was published in 1985 by Sajha Prakashan. The book was awarded Madan Puraskar in 2042 BS.

Synopsis
The play portrays a story of a travel in a mini bus. The bus has a driver, a helper and 17 passengers, and it is going to Baikuntha (the paradise). During the play, the bus keeps on moving and various events occurs inside as the bus pass though various imaginary places.

Reception 
The book received the Madan Puraskar for 2042 BS (c. 1985).

See also 

 Malati Mangale
 Muna Madan
 Agniko Katha

References

Madan Puraskar-winning works
Nepalese plays
20th-century Nepalese books
1985 plays
Nepali-language books